William Strudwick Arrasmith (July 15, 1898 – November 30, 1965) was an American architect known for his designs for Greyhound bus stations in the Streamline Moderne style popular in the 1930s and 1940s. Among the over 60 stations he designed are the Cleveland Greyhound Bus Station (1948), the Montgomery, Alabama, Greyhound Bus Station (1951), and the Evansville, Indiana, Greyhound Bus Terminal (1938) which are listed on the National Register of Historic Places.

Early life and family
William Arrasmith was born on July 15, 1898, to Thomas and Mary Strudwick at Hillsboro, North Carolina, in the United States. He studied at the University of North Carolina and graduated from the University of Illinois at Urbana–Champaign with a bachelor of science degree in architecture in 1921.

He met his future wife, Elizabeth "Betty" Beam, at Illinois. They had a daughter, Anne.

Career
Arrasmith moved to Louisville, Kentucky, in 1922 where he worked with Fred Morgan, E.T. Hutchings, and Brinton Davis. In 1929 he went into partnership with Herman Wischmeyer as Wischmeyer, Arrasmith, and Elswick. The firm's notable buildings included the Federal Land Bank and the Louisville Scottish Rite Temple (on which Arrasmith is not credited). He was later in partnership with Bill Tyler as Arrasmith & Tyler which later became Arrasmith & Judd and then Arrasmith, Judd, Rapp & Associates. As of 2015 the firm was trading as  Arrasmith, Judd, Rapp, Chovan, Inc.

He was known for his designs for Greyhound bus stations in the Streamline Moderne style that was popular in the 1930s and 40s. His first design for the company was a terminal in Louisville that opened in 1937. He also designed stations for the company in Columbus, Dayton, Washington, D.C., and Baltimore. Among the prime examples of his work is the Cleveland Greyhound Bus Station (1948) which is on the National Register of Historic Places along with eight of his other station designs. In total he designed over 60 stations for the company.

Other work by Arrasmith in the Louisville region included the Methodist Evangelical Hospital, the Police School, the science building and medical apartments for the University of Louisville, the 800 Apartments Building, Kentucky Fairgrounds, Kentucky Hotel, Byck's Department Store (St. Matthews and 4th Street), Kentucky State Reformatory (1939), and buildings for Western Kentucky University.

Buildings Designed by W.S. Arrasmith

Military service
Arrasmith was in the Reserve Officers' Training Corps while at Illinois and was in command of a veteran company in 1933. Following the Ohio River flood of 1937 he led efforts to build a pontoon bridge to link Louisville's downtown to the East End. During the Second World War he served with the United States Army 6th Corps Engineers in Europe and rose to the rank of lieutenant colonel in the army reserves.

Death and legacy
Arrasmith died on November 30, 1965, in Louisville, Kentucky. A collection of his papers is held by The Filson Historical Society. A book by Frank E. Wrenick devoted to Arrasmith's Greyhound designs was published by McFarland in 2006.

References

Further reading
 Wrenick, Frank E. (2006) The Streamline Era Greyhound Terminals: The Architecture of W.S. Arrasmith. McFarland.

External links 

Former Jackson Greyhound Terminal
Surviving Greyhound Terminals of W S Arrasmith, USA
 Restored Binghamton Greyhound station, Binghamton, New York

1965 deaths
1898 births
Architects from North Carolina
Art Deco architects
Military personnel from Illinois
People from Hillsborough, North Carolina
People from Louisville, Kentucky
Streamline Moderne architects
University of North Carolina alumni
University of Illinois School of Architecture alumni
United States Army officers
United States Army Corps of Engineers personnel
United States Army reservists
United States Army personnel of World War II